Emily Barclay (born 24 October 1984) is an English-born, New Zealander and Australian AFI award winning actress.

Career
Emily Barclay was born in Plymouth to a General practitioner and a landscape designer, and raised in Auckland, New Zealand, where she went to an all-girls school and attended Saturday morning drama classes. At the age of nine, Barclay played Hamlet in a school production and decided to become an actress. At the age of 13, she got herself an agent and supported herself between TV movies by working in a video store.

Diana Rowan (the same casting agent who discovered Anna Paquin, and Keisha Castle-Hughes) discovered Barclay in a school play and cast her as Celia in 2004's In My Father's Den, that raised the actress to prominence. For that film, Barclay won Most Promising Newcomer at the 2005 British Independent Film Awards.  She followed by moving to Australia – while continuing part-time with her degree in English and gender studies at the University of Auckland  – for a role in the critically acclaimed 2006 crime drama Suburban Mayhem directed by Paul Goldman, for which she collected an AFI Award for Best Actress.

Barclay's performance also lead to an invitation to her first stage performance, on Neil Armfield's 2009 production of Gethsemane in Sydney. Armfield later indicated Barclay to Lee Lewis, who cast her in the play That Face. In 2011, she performed in another Belvoir production, The Seagull, and acted opposite Geoffrey Rush in the Melbourne Theatre Company's The Importance of Being Earnest. In 2012, Barclay performed opposite Hollywood actors Michael Cera and Kieran Culkin in This Is Our Youth, returned to Belvoir with Strange Interlude and debuted at London's Young Vic performing on Three Sisters.

Barclay is currently represented by United Agents.

Barclay also starred in the music video "Big Jet Plane" by Angus & Julia Stone which was directed by Kiku Ohe in 2010.

She has cited her favourite actor as being Ewen Leslie.

Animal rights
The actress has had an active involvement in animal rights, working with the organisation Save Animals From Exploitation in anti-cruelty campaigns, including having posters put in her room in In My Fathers Den; she is a vegan.

In 2006, Barclay became an ambassador for Australian animal rights group Voiceless, the animal protection institute.  "I'm not against people who eat meat but I'd like them to know what happens in factory farms where highly intelligent animals live horrific lives."

Filmography

Film

Television

Stage

References

External links

Filmography at Karen Kay Management
Emily Barclay in the SAFE 2007 Calendar

1984 births
Living people
20th-century New Zealand actresses
21st-century New Zealand actresses
New Zealand child actresses
New Zealand film actresses
English emigrants to New Zealand
New Zealand television actresses
Actors from Auckland
Actors from Devon
New Zealand expatriates in England
Best Actress AACTA Award winners